ACHP may refer to:

 Advisory Council on Historic Preservation, an independent US Federal agency that promotes the preservation, enhancement, and productive use of the nation's historic resources
 African Charter on Human and Peoples' Rights, an international human rights instrument that seeks to promote and protect human rights and basic freedoms in the African continent